Tamasna (Berber: Tamesna, ⵜⴰⵎⵙⵏⴰ, Arabic: تامسنا) is a historical region between Bou Regreg and Tensift in Morocco. It includes the modern regions of Chaouia, Doukkala, Abda, Rhamna, Sraghna and Chiadma. The indigenous population is that of Barghwata who were driven by the Almohads who installed the Bedouin Arabs.
Regions of Morocco

Tribal composition 

 Chaouia 
 Doukkala 
 Abda 
 Rahamna 
 Sraghna
 Chiadma

References 

Geography of Morocco
Natural regions of Africa
Arab world
Geography of North Africa